Clyde Browne (August 5, 1872 in Old Hickory, OH – July 1, 1942 in Los Angeles, CA) was a printer associated with the Arroyo culture of the early 20th Century in Los Angeles County.

Browne began working as a printer with the Petaluma Imprint at the age of 15 and later worked for a number of San Francisco Bay Area newspapers before relocating to Los Angeles in 1902 or 1903 where he worked in the press room of the Los Angeles Examiner. Browne left the Examiner in 1909 during a labor dispute and opened his own print shop with Alexander B. Cartwright under the imprint "Browne and Cartwright". One of the imprint's first titles was the "Frosh Bible" for Occidental College in 1910. Browne would maintain a close association with Occidental for the remainder of his life, printing various college publications including two volumes of the yearbook. La Encina.

References

1872 births
1942 deaths
American printers
Businesspeople from Los Angeles
Businesspeople from Ohio